The Fifth Wisconsin Legislature convened from January 14, 1852, to April 19, 1852, in regular session. Senators representing even-numbered districts were newly elected for this session and were serving the first year of a two-year term.  Assemblymembers were elected to a one-year term.  Assemblymembers and even-numbered senators were elected in the general election of November 4, 1851.  Senators representing odd-numbered districts were serving the second year of their two-year term, having been elected in the general election held on November 5, 1850.

Major events

 January 5, 1852: Inauguration of Leonard J. Farwell as the 2nd Governor of Wisconsin.
 January 5, 1852: Inauguration of Timothy Burns as the 3rd Lieutenant Governor of Wisconsin.
 January 30, 1852: Assemblymember Matthew Murphy of Lafayette County resigned his seat after it was demonstrated that he had actually lost his election to George W. Hammett.
 November 2, 1852: Franklin Pierce elected President of the United States

Major legislation

 March 3, 1852: Act to incorporate Racine College, 1852 Act 65
 March 4, 1852: Act to incorporate the Milwaukee University, 1852 Act 79
 April 16, 1852: Act to set apart and incorporate the County of Kewaunee, 1852 Act 363
 April 17, 1852: Act to provide for the organization of a separate Supreme Court and for the election of Justices thereof, 1852 Act 395
 April 19, 1852: Act to authorize the business of Banking, 1852 Act 479
 April 19, 1852: Act to provide for the registration of Marriages, Births, and Deaths, 1852 Act 492
 April 19, 1852: Act to apportion and district anew the members of the Senate and Assembly of the State of Wisconsin, 1852 Act 499, increased the size of the Senate to 25 members, and the Assembly to 82.
 April 19, 1852: Act relating to Printing, 1852 Act 504

Party summary

Senate summary

Assembly summary

Sessions
 1st Regular session: January 14, 1852 – April 19, 1852

Leaders

Senate leadership
 President of the Senate: Samuel Beall, Lieutenant Governor
 President pro tempore: Eliab B. Dean, Jr.

Assembly leadership
 Speaker of the Assembly: James McMillan Shafter

Members

Members of the Senate
Members of the Wisconsin Senate for the Fifth Wisconsin Legislature:

Members of the Assembly
Members of the Assembly for the Fifth Wisconsin Legislature:

Employees

Senate employees
 Chief Clerk: John K. Williams
 Sergeant-at-Arms: Patrick Cosgrove

Assembly employees
 Chief Clerk: Alexander T. Gray
 Sergeant-at-Arms: Elisha Starr

References

External links

1852 in Wisconsin
Wisconsin
Wisconsin legislative sessions